Bisaltes is a genus of beetles in the family Cerambycidae, containing the following species:

 Bisaltes adustus (Burmeister, 1865)
 Bisaltes argentiniensis Breuning, 1971
 Bisaltes bilineellus Breuning, 1939
 Bisaltes bimaculatus Aurivillius, 1904
 Bisaltes brevicornis Breuning, 1939
 Bisaltes buquetii Thomson, 1868
 Bisaltes chilensis Breuning, 1939
 Bisaltes columbianus Breuning, 1971
 Bisaltes elongatus Breuning, 1939
 Bisaltes flaviceps Breuning, 1940
 Bisaltes fuchsi Breuning, 1971
 Bisaltes fuscoapicalis Breuning, 1950
 Bisaltes fuscodiscalis Breuning, 1943
 Bisaltes fuscomarmoratus Breuning, 1966
 Bisaltes montevidensis (Thomson, 1868)
 Bisaltes monticola Tippmann, 1960
 Bisaltes obliquatus Breuning, 1940
 Bisaltes petilus Galileo & Martins, 2009
 Bisaltes picticornis Galileo & Martins, 2003
 Bisaltes pictus Breuning, 1940
 Bisaltes poecilus (Aurivillius, 1900)
 Bisaltes ptericoptoides Breuning, 1942
 Bisaltes pulvereus (Bates, 1866)
 Bisaltes roseiceps Breuning, 1939
 Bisaltes sautierei Chalumeau & Touroult, 2004
 Bisaltes spegazzinii Bruch, 1911
 Bisaltes stramentosus Breuning, 1939
 Bisaltes strandi Breuning, 1940
 Bisaltes subreticulatus Aurivillius, 1920
 Bisaltes taua Galileo & Martins, 2003
 Bisaltes triangularis Breuning, 1940
 Bisaltes unicolor Galileo & Martins, 2003
 Bisaltes uniformis Breuning, 1939
 Bisaltes venezuelensis Breuning, 1943

References

 
Apomecynini
Cerambycidae genera